Laurent Bonnevay (28 July 1870, Saint-Didier-au-Mont-d'Or, Rhône – 28 May 1957) was a French centrist lawyer and politician during the Third and Fourth Republics who was a member first of the Republican Federation and then of the Democratic Republican Alliance centre-right groups.

Life
He was one of the few non-communists to refuse the Munich agreement of 1938, along with some militants from Action Française.  He was notably Garde des Sceaux in Aristide Briand's government (January 16, 1921 - January 15, 1922) and president of the investigative commission from February 6, 1934.  He was one of 'The Vichy 80' who refused to vote full powers to Marshal Philippe Pétain in 1940.

Although born in Saint-Didier-au-Mont-d'Or in his mother's family home and with a father originating from the canton of Lamure-sur-Azergues (where he built his political career), his wife's family had a house in Dardilly in which he frequently stayed (including the whole of the Second World War).

Posts
Municipal councillor of Lyon (1900–1904).
Conseiller général of the canton of Lamure (1902–1940 and 1945–1957).
President of the conseil général of the Rhône (1934–1940 and 1951–1957).
Député for the second district (circonscription) of Villefranche (1902–1924 and 1928–1941).
Senator for the Rhône (1924–1928).
Member of the Assemblée Constituante Provisoire (Provisional Constituting Assembly) (1944–1945).

References

Sources
This page is a translation of its French counterpart.

1870 births
1957 deaths
People from Lyon Metropolis
Politicians from Auvergne-Rhône-Alpes
Republican Federation politicians
Democratic Republican Alliance politicians
French Ministers of Justice
Members of the 8th Chamber of Deputies of the French Third Republic
Members of the 9th Chamber of Deputies of the French Third Republic
Members of the 10th Chamber of Deputies of the French Third Republic
Members of the 11th Chamber of Deputies of the French Third Republic
Members of the 12th Chamber of Deputies of the French Third Republic
French Senators of the Third Republic
Senators of Rhône (department)
Members of the 13th Chamber of Deputies of the French Third Republic
Members of the 14th Chamber of Deputies of the French Third Republic
Members of the 15th Chamber of Deputies of the French Third Republic
Members of the 16th Chamber of Deputies of the French Third Republic
French city councillors
The Vichy 80